Neshuro is an administrative center for Mwenezi District in Masvingo Province, south-eastern Zimbabwe. It also acts as one of the largest business centers in the drought-prone district. It is the staging front base from which aid organizations like CARE International, Oxfam launch their humanitarian actives across the district.

References

Business Centers in Mwenezi (District)
Populated places in Masvingo Province
Mwenezi (District)